Fontanes or Fontanès is the name or part of the name of several communes in France:

 Fontanes, Lot, in the Lot department
 Fontanes, Lozère, in the Lozère department
 Fontanès, Gard, in the Gard department
 Fontanès, Hérault, in the Hérault department
 Fontanès, Loire, in the Loire department
 Fontanès-de-Sault, in the Aude department
 Fontanes-du-Causse, in the Lot department